Nationality words link to articles with information on the nation's poetry or literature (for instance, Irish or France).

Events
 Early? – Poems written by Wil. Shake-speare, Gent. is published (posthumously) by John Benson in London, the first collection of Shakespeare's non-dramatic poetry, although incomplete and mangled and with some male pronouns changed to female in the sonnets (here reissued for the first time since original publication).
 English Cavalier poet Richard Lovelace, serving in the Bishops' Wars in Scotland, writes "To Lucasta, Going to the Warres" (published 1649)

Works published
 Francis Beaumont, Poems, including a translation from the Latin poetry of Ovid's Metamorphoses, which might not be by Beaumont; several other poems in the book are definitely not by him, according to The Concise Oxford Chronology of English Literature
 Thomas Carew, Poems, including "Coelum Brittanicum" 1634
 Richard Flecknoe, The Affections of a Pious Soule, unto our Savior-Christ, prose and poetry
 Ben Jonson:
 Art of Poetry, translated from the Latin of Horace; also contains Execration Against Vulcan; The Masque of the Gypsies and Epigrams to Severall Noble Personages in this Kingdome; posthumous edition
 The Workes of Benjamin Jonson, the second folio; Volume 1 reprints Workes 1616
 Richard Mather and John Eliot, and Thomas Weld The Whole Booke of Psalmes Faithfully Translated into English Metre, commonly known as the Bay Psalm Book, English Colonial American work
 Francis Quarles, Enchyridion
 Nathaniel Richards, The Tragedy of Messallina, the Roman Emperesse
 John Tatham, The Fancies Theater

Births
Death years link to the corresponding "[year] in poetry" article:
 December 14 (probable date) – Aphra Behn, born Eaffrey Johnson (died 1689), English woman playwright and poet
 Nozawa Bonchō 野沢 凡兆 (died 1714), Japanese haikai poet

Deaths
Birth years link to the corresponding "[year] in poetry" article:
 February/March – Richard Rowlands (born 1550), Anglo-Dutch antiquarian and writer
 March 22 – Thomas Carew (born 1595), English poet
 April 2
 Paul Fleming (born 1609), German poet and physician
 Maciej Kazimierz Sarbiewski (born 1595), Polish Jesuit and Latin-language poet
 April 28 (bur.) – William Alabaster (born 1567), English poet and playwright
 September 12 – William Alexander, 1st Earl of Stirling, (born 1567), Scottish statesman, courtier, poet and writer of rhymed tragedies
 October 1 – Claudio Achillini (born 1574), Italian polymath and poet
 Charles Aleyn, English poet
 Daniel Naborowski (born 1573), Polish Baroque poet
 Walter Quin (born c. 1575), Irish-born English court poet and author writing in English, Latin, French and Italian

See also

 Poetry
 17th century in poetry
 17th century in literature

Notes

17th-century poetry
Poetry